Huang Shiheng (1889-12 June 1978) was a Chinese politician and educator who served as president of Hunan University from December 1935 to July 1937.

Biography
Huang was born in Chen County (now Suxian District of Chenzhou), Hunan, in 1889. His father, Huang Ruhu, was a traditional Chinese intellectual. His brother, Huang Tigui, was a graduate student in Yuelu Academy. Huang attended the First High School of Chenzhou. He secondary studied at the First High School of Changsha and the High School Attached to Hunan Normal University. He received his bachelor's degree from the University of Iowa, and his master's degree from Columbia University.

He returned to China in 1920 and that year became director of History Department at Chengdu Normal School.

In 1923 he became a professor at Hunan Business School (now Hunan University) and became its President in 1924. He was President of Hunan University in December 1935, and held that office until July 1937.

In 1937, he was elected a member of the National Assembly.

In 1940 he was President of Chuanshan Private High School, a position he held until 1942.

After the founding of the Communist State, he taught at Hunan University. He was a researcher in Hunan Normal University in 1953.

He became the Vice-President of Hunan Provincial Research Institute of Culture and History in 1959.

On June 12, 1978, he died of illness in Changsha, Hunan.

Personal life
Huang had one son and two daughters:

 Son: Huang Tianze, a graduate student in the Department of Mechanical Engineering, at Hunan University
 Elder daughter: Huang Qiming, a translator
 Young daughter: Huang Qiyu, a teacher at Guangxi Normal University

References

External links

1889 births
Politicians from Chenzhou
1978 deaths
University of Iowa alumni
Columbia University alumni
Presidents of Hunan University
Academic staff of Hunan University
Republic of China politicians from Hunan
Educators from Hunan
People's Republic of China politicians from Hunan